Asoxime chloride, or more commonly HI-6, is a Hagedorn oxime used in the treatment of organophosphate poisoning.

References 

Cholinesterase reactivators
Aldoximes
Carboxamides
Pyridinium compounds
Chlorides